Gabriel Karlen (born 10 March 1994) is a Swiss ski jumper.

He competed in the 2015 World Cup season.

He represented Switzerland at the FIS Nordic World Ski Championships 2015 in Falun.

References

External links 
 

1994 births
Living people
Swiss male ski jumpers